La Poison is a 1951 French comedy drama film, written and directed by Sacha Guitry, starring Michel Simon and Louis de Funès.

Cast 
Michel Simon: Paul Louis Victor Braconnier, the gardener
Germaine Reuver: Blandine Braconnier, Paul's wife
Jean Debucourt: Maître Aubanel, the famous lawyer
Louis de Funès: André Chevillard, a citizen of Remonville
Marcelle Arnold: Germaine Chevillard, André's wife
Georges Bever: Mr Gaillard, the chemist of Remonville
Nicolas Amato: Victor Boitevin, an inhabitant
Jacques Varennes: the prosecutor
Jeanne Fusier-Gir: Mrs Tyberghen, the florist
Pauline Carton: Mrs Michaud, the grocer
Albert Duvaleix: Abbot Méthivier
Léon Walther: a senior magistrate
Henry Laverne: Judiciary President
Harry Max: Henri, an inhabitant

Remake 
The film was remade by Jean Becker as A Crime in Paradise in 2001.

References

External links 
 
 
 La Poison at the Films de France
La poison—or, How to Kill Your Wife an essay by Ginette Vincendeau at the Criterion Collection

1951 films
1951 comedy-drama films
French comedy-drama films
1950s French-language films
French black-and-white films
Films set in Paris
Films directed by Sacha Guitry
1950s French films